Organization of Communist Left (in Spanish: Organización de Izquierda Comunista, in Basque: Ezker Komunista Erakundea, in Catalan: Organització d'Esquerra Comunista, in Galician: Organización de Esquerda Comunista, OIC) was a communist political party in Spain founded in 1974. The OIC was a continuation of the existing Communist Workers Circles (COC), whose roots were in the Workers' Front of Catalonia (FOC), the Catalan version of the People's Liberation Front (FLP or FELIPE).

History
The organization had presence and influence in the labor movement of Vallès Oriental, Tarragona, Almussafes and in the construction sector of Madrid, Illes Balears, Córdoba, Granada and Camp de Morvedre.

The first Secretary General of the OIC was Dídac Fàbregas, who used the "nom de guerre" Jerónimo Hernández. On January 11, 1978 he resigned from his position as Secretary General due to a majority vote in the federal executive in which the fusion with the Communist Movement (MC) was approved. Four days later in a letter to the Federal Executive Commission Dídac Fàbregas renounced to his membership of the party. In January 1978 he joined the Socialist Party of Catalonia-Congress (PSC-C), where he was appointed as the head of the National Committee of Municipal and Urban Policy of this party.

In 1979 the OIC was finally absorbed by the MC, which led to an important part of its former founders and many historical leaders leave the organization, later joining the majority of them the PCE-PSUC or the PSOE. In Mallorca the majority of the local OIC joined the Socialist Party of Majorca (PSM).

References

 Sans Molas, J. (2015). L'Organització D'Esquerra Comunista En El Moviment Obrer: Les Plataformes I Comissions Obreres Anticapitalistes (1971-1977).

Political parties established in 1974
Political parties disestablished in 1979
Communist parties in Spain
Council communism
Anti-Francoism